Guraleus savuensis is a species of sea snail, a marine gastropod mollusk in the family Mangeliidae.

Description
The length of the shell attains 9 mm, its width 3 mm.

(Original description) The shell is elongately fusiform, with a rather short siphonal canal. It is rather strong, yellowish-white, with traces of red-brown bands (bleached). It contains scarcely 9 whorls, of which about 3 form a convexly whorled protoconch. Of these about the upper one is smooth, the rest at first faintly, then strongly ribbed, with numerous elegant ribs and traces of a keel near the base of visible part of last nuclear whorl. The subsequent whorls are angularly convex, separated by a deep, strongly waved suture. The sculpture consists of rounded, not continuous, axial ribs, 7 in number on the body whorl, crossed by spirals, of which a faint crenulated one, just below the suture, another strong one at the periphery, making the ribs slightly tubercled, and 3 spirals below it on penultimate whorl, 16 on the body whorl and siphonal canal, moreover a few very faint spirals above the periphery and numerous growth lines. The aperture is elongately oval, with a sharp angle above and a rather wide siphonal canal below. The peristome is broken, probably with a rather shallow sinus above. The columellar margin is nearly straight, with a thin layer of enamel.

Distribution
This marine species is endemic to Indonesia and can be found in the Savu Sea.

References

External links
  Tucker, J.K. 2004 Catalog of recent and fossil turrids (Mollusca: Gastropoda). Zootaxa 682:1–1295.
 

savuensis
Gastropods described in 1913
Molluscs
Animal phyla
Gastropods